The Evangelical Lutheran Church of Latvia (or LELB) is a Lutheran Protestant church in Latvia. Latvia's Lutheran heritage dates back to the Reformation. Both the Nazi and communist regimes persecuted the church harshly before religious freedom returned to Latvia in 1988. In contrast to Estonia, where state atheism reduced the once 80% Lutheran majority to barely 10% by 2011, the Latvian Lutheran church saw its membership drop to around 20% but has recovered and now includes approximately 30% of the population. The church reports having 250,000 members according to the Lutheran World Federation.

History
The Evangelical Lutheran Church of Latvia sees itself as being in a continuous tradition of Christian life since the earliest recorded Christian missionary work in the area, in the 12th century. Latvia was highly influenced by the Reformation and the style of Lutheran church which emerged followed the more Protestant German-type Lutheranism, rather than the episcopal or Nordic-type Lutheranism that emerged in Sweden, Denmark, Estonia and Finland. However, following the establishment of the Republic of Latvia (1918) the church moved towards a more historical catholic polity, and accepted consecration of bishops by the Church of Sweden. Along with the Church of Sweden, the ELCL now claims full apostolic succession. In 1975 the church, despite heavy opposition, decided to ordain women as pastors, but since 1993, under the leadership of Archbishop Jānis Vanags, it no longer does so. This position was confirmed in 2016 by a synodical resolution that only men may be ordained as priests. The resolution required a supermajority of at least 75% to pass, which it achieved with a 77% vote in favor.

Since the fall of communism, the church has experienced massive growth and expansion. A special Synod in April 1989, following the return to post-communist independence, established a network of revived congregations, and put in place an almost entirely new leadership.

Structure
The Church is episcopal and synodical. This means that it is led by a Council of Bishops and governed by a Synod composed of clergy and laity. The Synod elects a Consistory which has a smaller membership and meets more frequently, to carry on the work of Synod between its formal meetings.

The Church is composed of three dioceses:

Within each diocese there are, in addition to the bishop, a number of senior clergy known as Deans. One is Dean of the Cathedral, and the others serve as Area Deans supervising clergy within a defined district. There are 16 such Deaneries within Latvia. The church does not have the historic three-fold ministry of Bishops, Priests, and Deacons. In the place of Deacon is the ministry of Evangelist who work in programmes of social care and outreach.

Archbishop of Riga
The Archbishop serves as the president of the Council of Bishops, the Synod, and the Consistory. Following the death of Archbishop Kārlis Gailītis in 1992, a special Synod was convened in 1993 to elect a new Archbishop of Riga. Archbishop Jānis Vanags was elected and duly consecrated on 29 August 1993, by Henrik Svenungsson, the Bishop of Stockholm. Like all Bishops of the ELCL he will serve until he dies, or chooses to retire.

List of Archbishops of Riga
The medieval archbishops are listed at Archbishopric of Riga.

The following is a list of office holders since the restoration of the office. The first, Kārlis Irbe, was bishop in charge; the others have all been titled Archbishop of Riga.

 1922 - 1933 - Kārlis Irbe
 1933 - 1944 - Teodors Grīnbergs
 1948 - 1968 - Gustavs Tūrs
 1968 election - Pēteris Kleperis (elected archbishop, but died before his enthronement date)
 1968 election - Alberts Freijs (elected archbishop, but died before his enthronement date)
 1969 - 1985 - Jānis Matulis
 1986 - 1989 - Ēriks Mesters
 1989 - 1992 - Kārlis Gailītis (Archbishop Gailītis was killed in a car accident)
 1993 - present - Jānis Vanags

Theology
The Evangelical Lutheran Church of Latvia is known for its theological conservatism and since Jānis Vanags' consecration as archbishop in 1993, it has opposed women's ordination. The highest governing body of the church amended the church rules in 2016. The proposal that only men may be ordained required a supermajority of 75%, which it has achieved with a 77% voting in favour.
The church disapproves of active homosexuality and rejects same-sex unions. The church is also opposed to abortion and euthanasia.

Statistics
The Evangelical Lutheran Church of Latvia reports that there are 136 pastors and 86 evangelists serving its 300 congregations. In 2013, the estimated baptized membership was 250,000. In comparison, the independent Latvian Evangelical Lutheran Church Abroad has 25,020 baptized members.

Affiliations
The ELCL is a member of the Lutheran World Federation, the World Council of Churches, the Conference of European Churches, and the International Lutheran Council.

The ELCL is not in full church fellowship with those LWF member church bodies who practise ordinations and marriages of homosexuals, looking on LWF more as a forum of discussions for Lutherans. It holds observer status in the Porvoo Communion, which unites episcopal Lutheran churches and Anglican churches in northern Europe.

ELCL is in full fellowship with the Lutheran Church–Missouri Synod (LCMS), of the United States.

See also
 List of Lutheran dioceses and archdioceses

References

External links
 

Lutheran World Federation members
Lutheranism in Latvia
Members of the World Council of Churches